Warhammer 40,000: Armageddon is a computer wargame developed by Flashback Games and The Lordz Games Studio, and published by Slitherine Software for Windows on November 26, 2014. It is based on Games Workshop's tabletop wargame Warhammer 40,000.

Gameplay
Warhammer 40,000: Armageddon is a turn-based strategy wargame played on a hex grid, set on a polluted hive world where Imperium armies have to defend from ork hordes. It uses Panzer Corps game engine. There is co-op and player versus player multiplayer, either via online, hotseat, or play-by-mail methods.

Release
Warhammer 40,000: Armageddon was announced on May 21, 2013. The game was released on November 26, 2014. An iOS port was released on June 19, 2015. A macOS port was released on June 20, 2017. Several downloadable content (DLC) packs were released: Untold Battles, Vulkan's Wrath, Angels of Death, Glory of Macragge, and Ork Hunters in 2015, and Golgotha in 2016.

Reception

Warhammer 40,000: Armageddon received "mixed or average" reviews according to review aggregator Metacritic. Several critics called the game very similar to Panzer Corps, Slitherine's game from 2011.

Jim Cobb of Armchair General summarized: "[...] Warhammer 40,000: Armageddon captures the flavor and fascination of the Warhammer franchise. The turn-based nature adds a level of tactical thought to play. No gamer can do much wrong by getting this game. In fact, they will be harming themselves if they don’t get it."

Richie Shoemaker of Eurogamer said that "[a]t the core of Warhammer 40,000: Armageddon there is a very good strategy game, unfortunately too much of it is either obscured, poorly explained or needs attention before it can be given a recommendation."

Adam Smith of Rock Paper Shotgun said that "[i]t's an accessible wargame and a good place to start for those familiar with the fiction and looking to make the jump to hex-based warfare."

References

External links
Warhammer 40,000: Armageddon at Flashback Games
Warhammer 40,000: Armageddon at The Lordz Games Studio (archived)

2014 video games
Computer wargames
IOS games
MacOS games
Multiplayer and single-player video games
Multiplayer hotseat games
Multiplayer online games
Play-by-email video games
Slitherine Software games
Top-down video games
Video games with downloadable content
Armageddon
Windows games
Flashback Games games